Stella Corkery (born 1960) is a New Zealand visual artist and drummer, born in Tuatapere, New Zealand. Corkery's work is experimental and reflective, often commenting on contemporary ideas. She currently lives and works in Auckland, New Zealand.

Education 
Corkery attended the Elam School of Fine Art (University of Auckland) where she received a BFA (Hons) First Class Honors in 2012 and Master of Fine Arts (MFA) in 2013.

Visual art 

Corkery's paintings use traditional processes, such as oils, although she doesn't restrict herself to a particular style.  Her visual works include Smoke and Butterfly (2015) and Gas Light (2015).

In 2013 Corkery was selected to be part of the exhibition Freedom Farmers: New Zealand Artists Growing Ideas at the Auckland Art Gallery Toi o Tamaki. This exhibition showcased twenty New Zealand contemporary artists from various media, reflecting on concept such as utopia, sustainability, and artistic freedom.

Corkery's recent exhibitions in New Zealand include: Necessary Distraction: a painting show (Auckland Art Gallery Toi o Tamaki, 2015, with Saskia Leek, Julian Hooper, Nicola Farquhar, Kirstin Carlin, and James Cousins); Porous Moonlight (Papakura Art Gallery, 2013); and Episodic Nomadic (Gloria Knight, Auckland, 2013). She has held several exhibitions at the Michael Lett  gallery including: Theme for a Science Fiction Vampire (2017), Sparks (2015), Kicking Against The Pricks (2014), and a joint show with Jim Allen & Dan Arps (2016). Corkery has also exhibited outside New Zealand including Caravan (2014) at the Station Gallery in Melbourne, Australia, Patches (2017) and Keep Smiling the Boss Loves Idiots (2016), at Poppy's in New York, USA.

Music 
Corkery is a self-taught drummer and has been involved in the underground music scene since the late 1980s. She has been part of experimental, noise and lo-fi bands including Angelhead, Queen Meanie Puss, and White Saucer. Her first band, The Pleats, was formed in Dunedin around 1980 with Rachel Shearer (Lovely Midget, which Corkery was also a member of) and Debbie Hinden (Indigo Underworld).

Labels 
In the early 1990s she started the Pink Air and Girl Alliance record labels with her partner Alan Holt. Both labels were created to support musicians in Auckland, with The Pink Air label focusing experimental and psychedelic music and Girl Alliance part of the riot grrrl movement.

Discography

References

Further reading 
Artist files for Stella Corkery are held at:
 Angela Morton Collection, Takapuna Library
 E. H. McCormick Research Library, Auckland Art Gallery Toi o Tāmaki                                            
 Fine Arts Library, University of Auckland                                          
 Te Aka Matua Research Library, Museum of New Zealand Te Papa Tongarewa
Also see:
 Stella Corkery: Abandon All Complaints – The Social Life of Painting (2013) Henry Babbage, Auckland Art Gallery Toi O Tamaki (produced for the exhibition Freedom Farmers, New Zealand Artists Growing Ideas)

1960 births
Living people
20th-century New Zealand women artists
21st-century New Zealand women artists
New Zealand painters
New Zealand women painters
People from Auckland
People from Tuatapere
Elam Art School alumni
Riot grrrl musicians
New Zealand women in electronic music
Feminist musicians
Women drummers
New Zealand women musicians
New Zealand drummers
New Zealand electronic musicians